Grupo Antolín started its business as a mechanics garage for vehicle and agriculture machinery repairs in Burgos, Spain, and was run by Avelino Antolín López and his sons Avelino and José. Nowadays, Grupo Antolín is a manufacturer in the car interiors market internationally and a worldwide supplier of headliner substrates.

Grupo Antolín also develops, test, and manufactures interior parts such as Overheads & Soft Trim, Doors & Hard Trim, Lighting and Cockpits & Consoles.

On 31 August 2015, the company announced the acquisition of Magna Interiors, the interiors business of Magna International. Grupo Antolín acquired an automobile parts manufacturing plant in Nashville, Illinois, originally established in 1987 as Ligma Corporation, a joint venture between Magna International and Lignotock of West Germany.

The company won the Castilla y León Prize for Scientific and Technical Research and Innovation in 2017, awarded by the Junta de Castilla y León.

In 2018, it opens its 15th plant in the US in Shelby (Michigan) dedicated to door panels for the RAM vans of the FCA group. In that country, the company already has a workforce of 5,700 people. Number 16 is announced in Alabama.

References

External links
 
José Antolín Toledano, Chairman of Grupo Antolín, awarded with the 'Medalla de Oro al Mérito en el Trabajo'

Multinational companies headquartered in Spain
Spanish brands
Companies based in Castile and León
Manufacturing companies established in 1950
Burgos
Auto parts suppliers of Spain
Magna International
2015 mergers and acquisitions
Spanish companies established in 1950